Nesfi (also Romanized as Neşfī; also known as Nasabī and Nisfi) is a village in Rahmatabad Rural District, Rahmatabad and Blukat District, Rudbar County, Gilan Province, Iran. At the 2006 census, its population was 595, in 192 families.

References 

Populated places in Rudbar County